A list of works by the composer Mauricio Kagel.

Sources:

1950
 Palimpsestos for mixed choir a capella

1952
 Two Pieces for Orchestra
 Variations for mixed quartet (fl, cl, vln, vc)

1953
 Sextet (fl, cl, bcl, vln, vIa, vc); revised 1957 as String Sextet (2 vln, 2 vla, 2 vc)

1954
 Música para la torre ('Music for the Tower'); in four parts: 1) For Orchestra [the Two Pieces from 1952], 2) Study for Percussion, 3) Ostinato for Chamber Ensemble, 4) ensayo de musica concreta (Essay in musique concrète)
 Muertos de Buenos Aires, music for the film of the same title by Alejandro Sanderman
 Cinco cantos de Génesis for voice and piano
 Four Pieces for piano

1955
 Drei Klangstudien ('Three Studies in Sound')
 Ocho motetes apócrifos for mixed choir

1956
 De ruina mundis: Cantata for voice and instruments
 Aforismos de Apollinaire for clarinet and piano
 Prelude No. 1 for bandoneon
 Cuatro piezas breves for strings
 Elegía para clarinete solo for clarinet solo

1958
 Anagrama for vocal soloists, speaking choir and chamber ensemble

1959
 Transición II for piano, percussion and two tape recorders

1960
 Transición I for electronic sounds
 Sur scène: Chamber music theatre piece
 Sonant (1960/...) for guitar, double bass, harp, and skin instruments
 Pandorasbox (Bandoneonpiece) for bandoneon
 Journal de théâtre: Collection of situations for instruments, actors and props; later to comprise 'Pas de cinq' (1965), 'Camera oscura' (1965), 'Die Himmelsmechanik' (1965), 'Variaktionen' (1967) and 'Kommentar und Extempore' (1967)
 Le Bruit: Invection pour toute sorte de sources sonores et expressions injurieuses (unpublished, unperformed)

1961
 Mimetics (Metapiece) for piano; a) for solo piano, b) interrupted by other compositions, c) as Metapiece (Mimetics), simultaneous with other compositions by Kagel or other composers
 Heterophonie for orchestra

1962
 Improvisation ajoutée for organ; rev. 1968
 Antithese; a) Music for electronic and public sounds; b) Play for one actor with electronic and public sounds

1964
 Phonophonie: Four melodramas for two voices and other sound sources; rev. 1965; radiophonic version 1965
 Die Frauen ('The Women'): Theatrical piece for ladies for voices and instruments (unpublished, unperformed) 
 Prima vista for slide pictures and indeterminate number of sound sources
 Diaphonie Nos 1-3 for choir and/or orchestra and slide projectors
 Match for three players
 Composition und Decomposition: A reading piece

1965
 Tremens; a) Scenic montage of a test for two actors, electric instruments, percussion, tapes and slide projection; b) Variaktionen über Tremens: Scenic montage of a test for two actors, tapes and slide projection; c) Musik aus Tremens [instrumental version with tapes ad lib]
 'Pas de cinq': Walking scene for five actors; part of Journal de théâtre (1960)
 'Die Himmelsmechanik' ('The Mechanism of the Sky'): Composition with stage décors; part of Journal de théâtre (1960)
 'Camera oscura': Chromatic play for light sources and actors; part of Journal de théâtre (1960)
 Mirum for tuba

1966
 Music for renaissance instruments for 23 players; alt. Chamber Music for Renaissance Instruments for 2-22 players

1967
 String Quartet I/II
 'Kommentar und Extempore' ('Commentary and Extempore'): Monologues with gestures; part of Journal de théâtre (1960)
 'Variaktionen' ('Vari-actions') for singers and actors; part of Journal de théâtre (1960)
 Fantasy for organ with obbligati
 Montage for various sound sources [combination of several of Kagel's instrumental compositions]; Montage à titre de spectacle [version with theatrical works]

1968
 Hallelujah for voices
 Der Schall ('Sound') for five players
 Privat for lonely listener
 Ornithologica multiplicata for exotic and indigenous birds

1969
 Synchronstudie ('Study in Synchronicity') for singer, Foley artists and film projection
 Unter Strom ('Under Current') for three players
 (Hörspiel) Ein Aufnahmezustand (1. Dosis) ('(Radio Play) A State of Recording (first dose)')

1970
 Ludwig van: Homage by Beethoven
 Acustica: Music for experimental sound producers, loudspeakers and two to five players
 Klangwehr ('Sound Defence') for marching music corps
 Tactil for three
 Atem ('Breath') for one wind player
 Staatstheater: Scenic composition; constituents:
'Répertoire': Theatrical concert piece
'Einspielungen' ('Recordings'): Music for loudspeakers
'Ensemble' for 16 voices
'Debüt' for 60 voices
'Saison' ('Season'): Singspiel in 65 scenes
'Spielplan' ('Programme'): Instrumental music in action
'Kontra → Danse': Ballet for non-dancers
'Freifahrt' ('Free Ride'): Gliding chamber music
'Parkett' ('Stalls'): Concert mass scenes

1971
 (Hörspiel) Ein Aufnahmezustand (2. und 3. Dosis)
 Probe ('Rehearsal') for an improvised collective; radiophonic version 1972
 Morceau de concours for one or two trumpeters; rev. 1992
 Guten Morgen! ('Good morning!'): radio play consisting of advertisements

1972
 Programm: conversations with chamber music; sections:
'Abend' ('Evening') for vocal double quartet, trombone quintet, electric organ and piano
'Aus Zungen Stimmen' ('From Tongues Voices') for accordion quintet
'Charakterstück' ('Character Piece') for zither quartet
'Gegenstimmen' ('Countervoices') for mixed choir and obligatory harpsichord
'General Baß for continuing instrumental sounds
'Die Mutation' ('The Mutation') for men's (and/or boys') voices and obligatory piano
'Musi' for plucking orchestra
'Recitativarie' for singing harpsichordist
'Siegfriedp' for violoncello
'Unguis incarnatus est' for piano and...[bass instrument]
'Vom Hörensagen' ('Hearsay') for women's (and/or girls') choir and obligatory harmonium
 Exotica for extra-European instruments
 Con Voce for three mute players
 Variationen ohne Fuge ('Variations without Fugue') for large orchestra on Variations and Fugue on a Theme by Handel for piano Op. 24 by Johannes Brahms (1861/62)

1973
 1898 for children's voices and instruments; rev. 1996
 Zwei-Mann-Orchester ('Two-Man-Orchestra') for two one-man-orchestras

1975
 Soundtrack: A filmic radio play 
 Mare nostrum: Discovery, pacification and conversion of the Mediterranean region by a tribe from Amazonia [music theatre] 
 Kantrimiusik: Pastoral for voices and instruments 

1976
 Bestiarium: Acoustic fables on two stages
 Zählen und Erzählen ('Counting and Recounting') for non-grownups [music theatre by children]
 Die Umkehrung Amerikas ('The Reversal of America'): Epic radio play
 MM 51: A piece of film music for piano

1977
 An Tasten ('On Keys'): Piano etude
 Quatre degrés ('Four Stages'); sections:
'Dressur' ('Dressage'): Percussion trio for wooden instruments
'Présentation' for two
'Déménagement' ('Removal'): Silent play for stage workers
'Variété': Concert show for artistes and musicians

1978
 Tango Alemán for voice, violin, bandoneon, and piano
 Ex-Position; constituents:
'Die Rhythmusmaschinen' ('The Rhythm Machines'): Action for gymnasts, drum machines, and percussionists
'Chorbuch' ('Choir Book') for vocal ensemble and keyboard instruments
 'Zehn Marsche, um den Sieg zu verfehlen' ('Ten Marches to Miss the Victory') for winds and percussion; from Der Tribun (1979)
 Die Erschöpfung der Welt: Theatrical illusion in one act

1979
 Blue's Blue: An ethnomusicological reconstruction for four players
 Klangwölfe ('Sound Wolves') for violin and piano
 Der Tribun ('The Tribune'): Radio play for a political orator, marching sounds and loudspeakers
 Vox Humana? Cantata for solo loudspeaker, women's voices and orchestra
 Aus Deutschland: lieder opera

1981
 Mitternachtsstük for voices and instruments on fragments from the diaries of Robert Schumann (1828); fourth movement added in 1986
 Finale with chamber ensemble

1982
 Rrrrrrr...
a) A radio fantasy (with 41 pieces):
11 pieces for winds, double basses and percussion: 'Raccontando', 'Rauschpfeifen', 'Rejdovák', 'Register', 'Réjouissance', 'Reprisen', 'Reveille/Retraite', 'Rhapsodie', 'Rheinländer', 'Ritornell l ', 'Ritornell 2'
Seven pieces for mixed choir (piano ad lib): 'Rrrrrrr...' , 'Requiem', 'Resurrexit dominus', 'Rêverie', 'Rex tremendae', 'Romance', 'Ring Shouts'
Eight pieces for organ: 'Râga', 'Rauschpfeifen', 'Repercussa', 'Ragtime-Waltz', 'Rondeña', 'Ripieno', 'Rosalie', 'Rossignols enrhumés
Six pieces for two percussionists: 'Railroad Drama', 'Ranz des vaches', 'Rigaudon', 'Rim Shots & Co.', 'Ruf', 'Rutscher'
Four pieces for solo voice with piano accompaniment: 'Railroad Song', 'Rappresentatione sacra', 'Revolution Speech', 'Rural Blue'
Five pieces for jazz ensemble: 'Rackett', 'Rrrrrrre-bop', 'Reeds', 'Rhythm-Bone & Brush', 'Riff'
b) Radio play on 'A radio fantasy' for one speaker (1982)
 Fürst Igor, Strawinsky ('Prince Igor, Stravinsky') for bass voice and instruments
 Fragen: Hörspot ('Questions: Listening Slot')
 Szenario for strings and tape

1983
 Intermezzo for voices and chamber ensemble
 La trahison orale ('Oral treason'): A musical epic on the devil; radiophonic version 1987
 Two Ballads by Guillaume de Machaut; instrumental realization by Mauricio Kagel

1984
 Der Eid des Hippokrates ('Hippocrates' Oath') for piano three-hands
 ...nach einer Lektüre von Orwell ('...upon Reading Orwell'): Radio play in Germanic meta-language

1985
 Pan for piccolo and string quartet
 Saint Bach's Passion for solo voices, choirs and large orchestra
 Cäcilia: Ausgeplündert, ein Besuch bei der Heiligen ('Cecilia: looted, Visit at the Saint'); Radio play
 Trio in Three Movements for violin, violoncello and piano
 Mio caro Luciano: Tape collage

1986
 Aus dem Nachlaß ('From the Estate'): Pieces for viola, violoncello, and double bass
 Ein Brief ('A Letter'): Concert scene for mezzo and orchestra
 Old/New: Study for solo trumpet

1987
 Ce-A-Ge-E for piano and harmonizer
 For Us: Happy Birthday to You!; a) for four violoncellos; b) arranged for picc (doubling alto fl), cl, vla, db, mandoline, gt, hp, perc (1990)
 Third String Quartet in four movements
 Tantz-Schul: Ballet d'action; also version as Suite for Orchestra

1988
 Quodlibet for female voice and orchestra on French chanson lyrics from the fifteenth century

1989
 Music for keyboard instruments and orchestra
 Phantasiestück; a) for flute and piano; b) for flute and piano with accompaniment
 'Osten' ('East); from Die Stücke der Windrose for salon orchestra
 'Süden' ('South'); from Die Stücke der Windrose for salon orchestra
 Fragende Ode ('Questioning Ode') for double choir, brass and percussion
 Zwei Akte; a) Grand Duo for saxophone and harp; b) for two actors, saxophone and harp
 Les idées fixes: Rondo for orchestra

1990
 Liturgien for solo voices, double choir, and large orchestra
 'Nordosten' ('North-east); from Die Stücke der Windrose for salon orchestra
 Opus 1991: Concert piece for orchestra

1991
 "...den 24. xii. 1931": Garbled news for baritone and instruments
 'Nordwesten' ('North-west'); from Die Stücke der Windrose for salon orchestra
 'Südosten' ('South-east); from Die Stücke der Windrose for salon orchestra

1992
 Konzertstück for tympani and orchestra
 Étude No. 1 for large orchestra

1993
 Passé composé: KlavieRhapsodie ('piano rhapsody')
 Episoden, Figuren: Solo for accordion
 Fanfanfaren for four trumpets
 Melodien for carillon
 Fourth string quartet in three movements
 'Südwesten' ('South-west'); from Die Stücke der Windrose for salon orchestra

1994
 Nah und Fern ('Near and Far'): Acoustic listening piece for bells and trumpets with background
 'Westen' ('West'); from Die Stücke der Windrose for salon orchestra
 'Norden' ('North'); from Die Stücke der Windrose for salon orchestra
 Interview avec D. pour Monsieur Croche et orchestre; texts by Claude Debussy

1995
 Serenade for three players
 Schattenklänge ('Shadow Sounds'): Three pieces for bass clarinet
 L'art bruit: Solo for two
 À deux mains: Impromptu for piano

1996
 Études Nos 2–3 for large orchestra
 Orchestrion-Straat for chamber ensemble
 Auftakte, sechshändig ('Upbeats, six-hands') for piano and two percussionists; version for two pianos and two percussionists: Auftakte, achthändig (2003)
 Eine Brise ('A Breeze'): Fleeting action for 111 cyclists. Musically enriched sport event in the open

1997
 Ragtime à trois for violin, violoncello and piano
 Playback Play: News from the music fair; radio play
 Orgelmusik zu vier Händen ('Organ Music for four hands')

1998
 Duodramen for voices and orchestra
 Impromptu No. 2 for piano

1999
 Semikolon: Action with bass drum
 Schwarzes Madrigal ('Black Madrigal') for voices and instruments
 Entführung im Konzertsaal ('Abduction in the Concert Hall'): Musical report of an incident

2000
 Burleske for baritone saxophone and choir

2001
 Quirinus' Liebeskuss for vocal ensemble and instruments
 Broken Chords for large orchestra
 Second Trio in One Movement for violin, violoncello and piano
 Double Sextet for ensemble

2002
 Das Konzert for solo flute, harp, percussion and strings
 Der Turm zu Babel ('The Tower of Babel'): Melodies for solo voice

2003
 Andere Gesänge ('Other Chants'): Intermezzi for soprano et pour l'orchestre

2004
 Magic Flutes: Perpetual Canon Interrupted for 12
 Vorzeitiger Schlußverkauf Unvollendete Memoiren eines Toningenieurs ('Premature Sale: Unfinished Memoirs of a Sound Engineer'); radio play
 Motetten for eight violoncellos

2005
 Fremde Töne und Widerhall ('Foreign Notes and Echo') for orchestra 
 Capriccio for two pianos 
 Fünf Vokalisen for a countertenor

2006
 L'Invention d'Adolphe Sax for saxophone quartet and chamber choir 
 Divertimento? Farce for ensemble
 Fifth string quartet in two movements

2007
 Quasi niente for closed mouths
 Verborgene Reime for choir and percussion

2008
 In der Matratzengruft for tenor solo and ensemble

References

Kagel, Mauricio, compositions by